The governor of Arizona is the head of government of the U.S. state of Arizona. As the top elected official, the governor is the head of the executive branch of the Arizona state government and is charged with faithfully executing state laws. The governor has the power to either approve or veto bills passed by the Arizona State Legislature; to convene the legislature; and to grant pardons, except in cases of impeachment. The governor is also the commander-in-chief of the state's military forces.

Twenty-four people have served as governor over 28 distinct terms. All of the repeat governors were in the state's earliest years, when George W. P. Hunt and Thomas Edward Campbell alternated as governor for 17 years and, after a two-year gap, Hunt served another term. One governor, Evan Mecham, was successfully impeached, and one, Fife Symington, resigned upon being convicted of a felony. The longest-serving governor was Hunt, who was elected seven times and served just under fourteen years. The longest single stint was that of Bruce Babbitt, who was elected to two four-year terms after succeeding to the office following the death of his predecessor, Wesley Bolin, serving nearly nine years total. Bolin had the shortest tenure, dying less than five months after succeeding as governor. Arizona has had five female governors, the most in the United States, and was the first—and until 2019 (when Michelle Lujan Grisham succeeded Susana Martinez in neighboring New Mexico) the only—state where female governors served consecutively.

The current governor is Democrat Katie Hobbs, who took office on January 2, 2023. Five women, including Hobbs, have served as governor, the most of any state.

Governors

Confederate Arizona

In Tucson between April 2 and April 5, 1860, a convention of settlers from the southern half of New Mexico Territory drafted a provisional constitution for "Arizona Territory", three years before the United States would create such a territory. This proposed territory consisted of the part of New Mexico Territory south of 33° 40' north. On April 2, they elected a governor, Dr. Lewis S. Owings. The provisional territory was to exist until such time as an official territory was created, but that proposal was rejected by Congress at the time.

On March 16, 1861, soon before the American Civil War broke out, a convention in Mesilla voted that the provisional territory should secede from the Union and join the Confederacy. Dr. Lewis S. Owings remained on as the provisional governor of the territory.

The Confederacy took ownership of the territory on August 1, 1861, when forces led by Lieutenant Colonel John R. Baylor won decisive control of the territory, and Baylor proclaimed himself governor. The Arizona Territory  (Confederate) was formally organized on January 18, 1862. On March 20, 1862, Baylor issued an order to kill all the adult Apache and take their children into slavery. When Confederate President Jefferson Davis learned of this order, he strongly disapproved and demanded an explanation. Baylor wrote a letter December 29, 1862, to justify his decision, and after this was received, Davis relieved Baylor of his post and commission, calling his letter an "avowal of an infamous crime". By that time, the Confederate government of Arizona Territory was in exile in San Antonio, Texas, as the territory had been effectively lost to Union forces in July 1862; no new governor was appointed.

Governors of the Territory of Arizona

Arizona Territory was formed on February 24, 1863, from New Mexico Territory, remaining a territory for 49 years.

Governors of the State of Arizona
The state of Arizona was admitted to the Union on February 14, 1912, the last of the contiguous states to be admitted.

The state constitution of 1912 called for the election of a governor every two years. The term was increased to four years by a 1968 amendment. The constitution originally included no term limit, but an amendment passed in 1992 allows governors to succeed themselves only once; before this, four governors were elected more than twice in a row. Gubernatorial terms begin on the first Monday in the January following the election. Governors who have served the two term limit can run again after four years out of office.

Arizona is one of seven states which does not have a lieutenant governor; instead, in the event of a vacancy in the office of governor, the secretary of state, if elected, succeeds to the office. If the secretary of state was appointed, rather than elected, or is otherwise ineligible to hold the office of governor, the first elected and eligible person in the line of succession assumes the office. The state constitution specifies the line of succession to be the Secretary of State, Attorney General, State Treasurer and Superintendent of Public Instruction, in that order. If the governor is out of the state or impeached, the next elected officer in the line of succession becomes acting governor until the governor returns or is cleared. In either case, any partial term counts toward the limit of two consecutive terms.

To date, the line of succession has gone beyond the secretary of state only once, when Bruce Babbitt, as attorney general, became governor upon the death of Wesley Bolin; Rose Mofford, then serving as secretary of state, had been appointed to replace Bolin after Bolin succeeded to the governorship. Bolin had become governor when Raúl Héctor Castro resigned to accept appointment as ambassador to Argentina. Mofford later became acting governor after Evan Mecham was impeached by the House of Representatives, and succeeded to the governorship when Mecham was removed from office after his conviction by the Senate.

See also
 Gubernatorial lines of succession in the United States#Arizona

Notes

References
General

 
 
 
 
 
 
 
 

Constitution

 

Specific

External links

 Office of the Governor of Arizona

Lists of state governors of the United States
Arizona Territory

Governors
Political history of Arizona